Park Chang-hyun (born June 8, 1966) is a South Korean football coach and former player.

References

 The Legends of K-League - Park Chang-hyun

External links
 

1966 births
Living people
South Korean footballers
Association football forwards
South Korean football managers
Pohang Steelers managers
Pohang Steelers players
Jeonnam Dragons players
K League 1 players
Hanyang University alumni